Steven Sweet (born Steven Chamberlin on October 29, 1965, in Wadsworth, Ohio, United States) is a Los Angeles-based drummer who is most famous for being a member of Warrant.

Personal information
Before joining Warrant he was in the glam metal band Plain Jane with Jani Lane. He lives with his wife Beth, a graduate of the Carnegie Mellon drama program and a musical artist in her own right. In addition to touring with the band Warrant, Steven divides his time between studio session work, songwriting and portrait painting. He has a daughter. Steven has his own business: painting portraits of pets.

Steven grew up playing the drums and whatever instruments were available in the household.  The second son in a family of three multi-talented boys, Steven showed artistic talent from an early age, creating illustrations, paintings and gifts. He also displayed an ability to mimic the styles of his favorite drummers. Along with this ability came a remarkable vocal range. At age 15 he was performing the music of Rush, Van Halen, AC/DC and many others in bar bands with his brother, David (a studio owner and musical producer based out of the Los Angeles area.) Steven designed logos, album artwork and marketing materials while still in his teens.

Warrant
Steven Sweet replaced original Warrant drummer Max Asher. He joined the band with lead singer and songwriter, Jani Lane (John Oswald) both of whom were born and raised near Cleveland, Ohio (specifically, the Akron area). After touring the club circuit in southern Florida in separate bands, Steven and Jani moved to the Los Angeles area.  Steven, along with Jani were signed to the Columbia record label within two years of their arrival and subsequent collaboration with Erik Turner and Jerry Dixon of Warrant. Steven played the driving rhythms and sang backup vocals on the album Dirty, Rotten, Filthy, Stinkin Rich which quickly sold 500,000 units thus making it a certifiable "Gold Record."  The album produced a number two hit on the Billboard Top 40, a ballad entitled "Heaven". Only the duo Milli Vanilli stood between Warrant and a number one hit. The band toured heavily, pushing the album into Platinum and quickly followed up with a second album, Cherry Pie which also went Platinum.

The band's videos were iconic, particularly "Cherry Pie" which featured a young blonde beauty (Bobbie Brown) serving up homemade pie in back of a cherry red convertible. Steven participated in the recording and video performance of a collaborative single, along with stars of television, screen, and the Billboard charts - the proceeds of which benefitted AIDs research. The video captured the kind of energy evident in the previously released, "We Are The World" single. Steven can also be seen mugging for the camera on the band's own concert video which features videos, back-stage footage, interviews and a sample of the road trip that was Steven's life during the early years.

Warrant's sudden success and notoriety played havoc with the personal lives of its members. Steven experienced sudden prosperity and was soon living in the Hollywood Hills, visiting his home whenever there was a break in the touring schedule. Fortunes changed however with the commercial disappointment of Warrant's third release, Dog Eat Dog, despite the fact that the album was the band's most mature effort to date.    Jani Lane was responsible for a couple of masterpiece tracks and the band never sounded so tight.

After Warrant's third studio album with Columbia, Dog Eat Dog, Steven Sweet was excluded from further touring with the band amidst the walkout of singer Jani Lane. With Joey Allen's departure soon after, the band members were not on good terms, though each continued to record on other projects. Steven and Joey remained good friends during the following decade.

Steven has since rejoined the new lineup of Warrant, consisting of all the original members, other than Jani Lane.  Robert Mason, ex Lynch Mob vocalist has taken over vocal duties.  Current lineup consists of Robert Mason, Joey Allen, Erik Turner, Jerry Dixon, and Steven. In 2008, Warrant announced a summer amphitheater tour with Cinderella and (George Lynch's) Lynch Mob.

Steven continues to record his own compositions when not touring. His vocal style is multifaceted, ranging from heavy rock, to soulful blues and R&B.

Equipment 
Sweet currently uses Pearl drums, Remo drumheads, Sabian cymbals, and Ahead drumsticks.

Discography

with Warrant
 Dirty Rotten Filthy Stinking Rich (1989)
 Cherry Pie (1990)
 Dog Eat Dog (1992)
 Born Again (2006)
 Rockaholic (2011)
 Louder Harder Faster (2017)

Soundtrack appearances

References

External links
Interview with Steven Sweet

American heavy metal drummers
Warrant (American band) members
People from Wadsworth, Ohio
1965 births
Living people
Musicians from Ohio
20th-century American drummers
American male drummers